Airole (locally ) is a comune (municipality) in the Province of Imperia in the Italian region of Liguria, located about  southwest of Genoa and about  west of Imperia, on the border with France.

The municipality of Airole contains the frazioni (subdivisions, mainly villages and hamlets) Collabassa, case Noceire, and case Giauma.

Airole borders the following municipalities: Breil-sur-Roya (France), Dolceacqua, Olivetta San Michele, and Ventimiglia.

Demographic evolution

References

External links
 www.comune.airole.im.it/

Cities and towns in Liguria
Articles which contain graphical timelines